Phi Psi may refer to:
 Phi Kappa Psi, an American collegiate fraternity created by William Henry Letterman and Charles Page Thomas Moore.
 Phi Psi (professional), an American collegiate professional fraternity, specializing in the area of textiles and manufacturing engineering.
 Dihedral angles of biological molecules